Miniophyllodes is a genus of moths of the family Erebidae. The genus was erected by Joseph de Joannis in 1912.

Species
Miniophyllodes aurora de Joannis, 1912
Miniophyllodes sikorai Viette, 1974

References

Catocalinae